Kamal De Gregory (born 29 January 1974) is a Bahamian retired international soccer player.

Club career
Degregory played college soccer for the University of Central Florida and had stints in Costa Rica and Trinidad and Tobago as well as in Brazil.

International career
He made his international debut for Bahamas in a March 2004 FIFA World Cup qualification match against Dominica and had earned a total of 9 caps, scoring no goals. He has represented his country in 4 FIFA World Cup qualification matches.

References

External links

1974 births
Living people
Association football fullbacks
Bahamian footballers
Bahamas international footballers
UCF Knights men's soccer players
Belén F.C. players
Morvant Caledonia United players
Bahamian expatriate footballers
Expatriate footballers in Costa Rica
Expatriate footballers in Trinidad and Tobago
Expatriate footballers in Brazil
American people of Bahamian descent
American soccer players
Soccer players from Orlando, Florida
Liga FPD players
Bahamian expatriate sportspeople in Trinidad and Tobago
Bahamian expatriate sportspeople in Brazil
Bahamian expatriate sportspeople in Costa Rica